Andrew Huang may refer to:

 Andrew Huang (hacker) (born 1975), American hacker
 Andrew Huang (musician) (born 1984), Canadian musician
 Andrew Thomas Huang, Chinese-American artist and director